Waging War: The Clash Between Presidents and Congress, 1776 to ISIS is a book written by David J. Barron and published in 2016 by Simon & Schuster.  It was the 2017 recipient of the Colby Award.

References 

2016 non-fiction books
Political science books
Simon & Schuster books